Juventus F.C. finished in 4th place in Serie A and participated in the Coppa Italia.

Squad

Goalkeepers
  Stefano Tacconi
  Luciano Bodini

Defenders
  Roberto Tricella
  Luigi De Agostini
  Pasquale Bruno
  Luciano Favero
  Sergio Brio
  Antonio Cabrini
  Nicolò Napoli

Midfielders
  Giancarlo Marocchi
  Rui Barros
  Roberto Galia
  Massimo Mauro
  Angelo Alessio
  Oleksandr Zavarov
  Marino Magrin

Attackers
  Renato Buso
  Alessandro Altobelli
  Michael Laudrup

Competitions

Serie A

Matches

Top scorers
  Rui Barros 12
  Renato Buso 7
  Michael Laudrup 6
  Luigi De Agostini 6 (4)
  Alessandro Altobelli 4
  Roberto Galia 3

Coppa Italia 

First round

Second round

UEFA Cup

First round

Second round

Third round

Quarter-finals

References

Juventus F.C. seasons
Juventus